Heinrich is a surname of German origin. Notable persons with that surname include:

 Alexander Geynrikh (born 1984), footballer from Uzbekistan 
 Annemarie Heinrich (1912-2005), German-Argentine photographer
 Bernd Heinrich (born 1940), German-American biologist
 Carl Heinrich (1880–1955), American entomologist
 Cláudio Heinrich (born 1972), Brazilian actor
 Frank Heinrich (born 1964), German politician
 Gabriela Heinrich (born 1963), German politician
 Herbert William Heinrich (1886–1962), American industrial safety engineer
 Hartmut Heinrich (born 1952), German marine geologist and climatologist
 Jörg Heinrich (born 1969), German footballer
 Kirk Hinrich (born 1981), American basketball player
 Martin Heinrich (born 1971), American politician
 Michael Henrich (born 1980), Canadian ice hockey player
 Volker Heinrich, German naturalist

See also
 Heinrich (given name)
 Heinrich (disambiguation)
 Heinrichs

German-language surnames
Patronymic surnames
Surnames from given names